Prawaal Raman is an Indian film director and screenwriter known for his works in Hindi cinema. He has written and directed films like Darna Mana Hai (2003), Gayab (2004), Darna Zaroori hai (2006), 404 (2011) and Main Aur Charles (2015).

Career
Raman started his career as an assistant director to Ram Gopal Varma and assisted him as second unit director in  Jungle and  Company. Post Company, Ram Gopal Varma assigned the project Darna Mana Hai to him as the director. The multi starrer film released in 2003 and was critically acclaimed. In 2015, Raman wrote and directed Main Aur Charles, starring Randeep Hooda, Richa Chadda and Adil Hussain. His next directorial film, Dr. Ajoy Kumar is in its pre-production phase. He has produced documentaries for Prayas, an NGO in New Delhi operating in more than seven states in India.

Non film work
In 2012 Due to the increasing suicide amongst school students, Raman organised an anti-suicide campaign in Jamshedpur with Jeevan NGO and Loyola School which had a series of seminar. Guest speakers were Randeep Hooda, Rahul Bose, Sunita Menon, Nishikant Kamat, Satyakaam Gupta and Raman, himself.

He has been a guest speaker for leadership training program for Praxair, organized by Abacus Management Consultants Pvt. Ltd. New Delhi in 2012 where he spoke about mutual faith and trust within a corporate structure. He has also been a guest speaker along with Tisca Chopra at Masina Metro Hospital and spoke about how to deal with people suffering from bipolar disorder.

Raman has been honored by Sandeep Marwah with the life membership of International Film And Television Club of Asian Academy of Film & Television at Noida Film City.

Filmography

References

Living people
Film directors from Mumbai
Indian male screenwriters
Hindi-language film directors
21st-century Indian film directors
[[Category:Year of birth missing 
(living people)]]
Year of birth missing (living people)